Brandejs is a Czech-language surname, a variant of Brandis. 

The surname may refer to:
Adam Brandejs, Canadian artist, and author of Genpets
Václav Brandejs and Ivan Brandejs, founders of ProFe, a Czech aircraft manufacturer
Petr Brandejs, past banjo of the Czech bluegrass band Poutníci 
Milan Brandejs, mayor of Teplice nad Metují (as of 2013)

Czech-language surnames